Panagiotis Dilberis (born 28 September 1974) is a Greek retired football goalkeeper and current manager.

References

1974 births
Living people
Greek footballers
Iraklis Thessaloniki F.C. players
Agrotikos Asteras F.C. players
Greek football managers
Agrotikos Asteras F.C. managers
Apollon Pontou FC managers
Panserraikos F.C. managers
Association football goalkeepers
Footballers from Thessaloniki